The 1980 Oklahoma State Cowboys football team represented Oklahoma State University in the Big Eight Conference during the 1980 NCAA Division I-A football season. In their second season under head coach Jimmy Johnson, the Cowboys compiled a 3–7–1 record (2–4–1 against conference opponents), tied for fourth place in the conference, and were outscored by opponents by a combined total of 268 to 187.

The team's statistical leaders included Ed Smith with 613 rushing yards, Jim Traber with 619 passing yards, Mel Campbell with 536 receiving yards, and placekicker Colin Ankersen with 39 points scored.

The team played its home games at Lewis Field in Stillwater, Oklahoma.

Schedule

Roster

After the season

The 1981 NFL Draft was held on April 28–29, 1981. The following Cowboys were selected.

References

Oklahoma State
Oklahoma State Cowboys football seasons
Oklahoma State Cowboys football